Antonio Ramon Horta AG-7 is a medical school in Cuba that contains 315 Pakistani students. The campus is located in Agramonte, which is a small town and a hamlet of Jagüey Grande, in Matanzas Province. The campus has more than twenty professors.

Overview
Because of poor facilities in AG7, the students forced government to be shifted to medical university near to a hospital. The school has been evacuated and the students shifted to Sancti Spiritus and a provincial hospital with better facilities.

All these students have been shifted to ELAM sub campus Medical Sciences University  Of Sancti Spiritus.

See also
 José María Aguirre T9
 Forest siege (2010)
 Máximo Santiago Haza
 ELAM (Latin American School of Medicine) Cuba

References

Medical schools in Cuba
Jagüey Grande
Law enforcement in Cuba